The 1935–36 Illinois Fighting Illini men's basketball team represented the University of Illinois.

Regular season
The 1935–36 season would turn out to be Craig Ruby's 14th and final year of coaching at the University of Illinois.  It would also turn out to be Ruby's final head coaching job anywhere as he would leave to pursue a career with Hallmark Greeting Cards.   Ruby's tenure at Illinois ranks 3rd behind Lou Henson (21 years) and Harry Combes (20 years).  His 148 wins also ranks 5th behind Henson (423) Combes (316) and Bruce Weber (210) and Doug Mills (151). Along with future head coach Harry Combes, the Illini returned 10 lettermen from a team that had finished in first place in the Big Ten the year before.  Unfortunately for the Illini, they lost 3 conference games at home and finished with a record of 7 wins and 5 losses. The team finished the season with an overall record of 13 wins 6 losses.  The starting lineup included captain Howard Braun and Wilbur Henry at guard, Harry Combes, Harold Benham and James Vopicka at forward, with Robert Riegel at the center position.

Roster

Source

Schedule

|-	
!colspan=12 style="background:#DF4E38; color:white;"| Non-Conference regular season

|- align="center" bgcolor=""

|-	
!colspan=9 style="background:#DF4E38; color:#FFFFFF;"|Big Ten regular season

Bold Italic connotes conference game
												
Source

References

Illinois Fighting Illini
Illinois Fighting Illini men's basketball seasons
1935 in sports in Illinois
1936 in sports in Illinois